The 2018 Paris–Troyes was the 60th edition of Paris–Troyes road cycling one day race. It was part of UCI Europe Tour in category 1.2.

Teams
Twenty-two teams were invited to take part in the race. These included five UCI Professional Continental teams and seventeen UCI Continental teams.

General classification

References

2018 UCI Europe Tour
2018 in French sport